The list of shipwrecks in February 1828 includes some ships sunk, foundered, grounded, or otherwise lost during February 1828.

1 February

4 February

8 February

9 February

11 February

12 February

13 February

14 February

16 February

17 February

18 February

19 February

20 February

22 February

23 February

25 February

Unknown date

References

1828-02